A salad bowl is a serving dish for salad. It can also refer to:

 Salad bowl (cultural idea), a cultural idea referring to the United States
 Salad Bowl (game), a defunct, annual, post-season college football bowl game
 Salad Bowl strike, a series of strikes, mass pickets, boycotts and secondary boycotts in 1970, led by César Chávez and United Farm Workers, that led to the largest farm worker strike in U.S. history
 The Salinas Valley in California, often referred to as the world's salad bowl because of the volume of produce exported from the region
 A bowl of salad
 Colloquial term for the Meisterschale, the trophy awarded to the German champions in association football

See also 
 Breadbasket